Two vessels of the Royal Navy have been named HMS Glenmore:
  was a 36-gun Amazon-class frigate launched in 1796 and sold in 1814.
  was the paddle steamer Glen Gower, launched in 1922. She was hired as a minesweeper in 1939, became an anti aircraft ship in 1942, and was used as an accommodation ship between 1945 and 1947.

References

 

Royal Navy ship names